The women's 100 metres hurdles event at the 1999 European Athletics U23 Championships was held in Göteborg, Sweden, at Ullevi on 31 July and 1 August 1999.

Medalists

Results

Final
1 August
Wind: -0.4 m/s

Heats
31 July
Qualified: first 2 in each heat and 2 best to the Final

Heat 1
Wind: -1.2 m/s

Heat 2
Wind: 2.6 m/s

Heat 3
Wind: 1.5 m/s

Participation
According to an unofficial count, 19 athletes from 12 countries participated in the event.

 (1)
 (3)
 (3)
 (2)
 (1)
 (1)
 (1)
 (1)
 (1)
 (1)
 (1)
 (3)

References

100 metres hurdles
Sprint hurdles at the European Athletics U23 Championships